Ignatius Ganago (born 16 February 1999) is a Cameroonian professional footballer who plays as a forward for Ligue 1 club Nantes and the Cameroon national team.

Club career

Early career
Ganago was part of the EFCB junior academy in Cameroon before joining Nice in 2017.

Nice
Ganago made his professional debut for Nice in a 4–0 Ligue 1 win against Monaco on 9 September 2017, coming on for Mario Balotelli in the 74th minute, during which he also scored his first goal for the club.

Lens
On 10 July 2020, Ganago signed for newly promoted Ligue 1 club Lens.

Nantes
On 1 September 2022, the last day of the 2022 summer transfer window, Ganago moved to Lens' league rivals Nantes on a four-year contract. The transfer fee paid to Lens was reported as €3.5 million excluding bonuses.

International career
Ganago debuted for the senior Cameroon national team in a friendly 0–0 tie with Tunisia on 12 October 2019. Later that month his club Nice refused to release him for the Under-23 AFCON tournament.

Personal life
Ganago’s four-year-old daughter passed away on 13 February 2023, following an illness.

Career statistics

Club

International

Honours
Cameroon
 Africa Cup of Nations bronze: 2021

References

External links
 EFBC

Living people
1999 births
Footballers from Douala
Cameroonian footballers
Association football forwards
Cameroon international footballers
2021 Africa Cup of Nations players
Ligue 1 players
Championnat National 2 players
OGC Nice players
RC Lens players
FC Nantes players
Cameroonian expatriate footballers
Cameroonian expatriate sportspeople in France
Expatriate footballers in France